Yuri Drozdovskij (born 22 May 1984 in Odesa) is a Ukrainian chess Grandmaster. 

He won the European Rapid Championship in 2006 and tied for first place at Cappelle-la-Grande in 2007.
Drozdovskij was equal first (losing out on tie-break to Pavel Tregubov) at the 4th Pivdenny Bank Cup 2008, a rapid tournament held annually in Odesa. This was an outstanding result, as he finished ahead of Boris Gelfand, Ruslan Ponomariov, Anatoly Karpov and Viktor Korchnoi. In 2009 he was a member of the bronze medal-winning Ukrainian team at the European Team Chess Championship.

His current Elo rating is 2614.

Personal life 
Since 2009 Yuri Drozdovskij is married to Ukrainian chess grandmaster Natalia Zdebskaya.

References

External links

Yuri, Drozdovskij Achievements at GrossClub.com

1984 births
Living people
Chess grandmasters
Ukrainian chess players
Odesa University alumni